The River Add is a river which runs through Argyll and Bute on the West of Scotland. Historically, it was known as the river Airigh but to avoid confusion with the Aray (which gives its name to Inveraray), it was renamed the River Add.

The surrounding valley still retains the name Glen Airigh, and The river gave rise to the name Glassary (Glas Airigh''), by which the surrounding district of Glassary is known. In turn, this forms the second part of the name of Kilmichael Glassary, a village in the lower parts of the valley. Kilmichael Glassary is the home village of the founder of the Campbells of Auchinbreck, a senior cadet branch of Clan Campbell.

The river begins at Loch Sidheannach, which is fed from the nearby hills, including Loch nan Losgann, close to the peak of Beinn Dubh Airigh. After passing through a heavily wooded area it goes through a tall Concrete dam with a control centre and a fish ladder creating hydroelectricity for loch glashan then it is joined by several small tributaries.
 
It is joined by a tributary from the Blackmill Loch, the Feorlin reservoir and Abhainn Bheag an Tunns just before skirting the northern side of Loch Glashan (a much larger reservoir which feeds the lochgair power station. 

From there, it passes through Kilmichael Glassary (Gleann Cill Mhicheil Glas-Airigh) and Allt Eas an Amhuinn (Bridgend River) which is one of the many tributaries feeding the Add, the river also meanders through the Bog fields on the Mòine Mhòr Nature Reserve, then ends at Loch Crinan by the hamlet of Bellanoch, where it is crossed by islandadd bridge an 1851 cast-iron bridge. Source Loch Sidheannach Mouth Atlantic Ocean and sea inlet loch Crinan.

References

Rivers of Argyll and Bute